Yang Guang (569–618), or Emperor Yang of Sui, was the second emperor of the Sui dynasty.

Yang Guang may also refer to:
Yeung Kwong (1926–2015), Hong Kong pro-Communist activist
Yang Guang (mezzo-soprano), Chinese mezzo-soprano
Yang Guang (giant panda), giant panda in Edinburgh Zoo

Sportspeople
Yang Guang (hurdler) (born 1963), Chinese hurdler
Yang Guang (ski jumper) (born 1984), Chinese ski jumper

See also
Yangguang, a town in Tonghai County, Yunnan, China
 Yang Gang (disambiguation)